Waldemar Fornalik (born 11 April 1963 in Myślenice) is a Polish football manager who is currently in charge of Ekstraklasa club Zagłębie Lubin. A former player, he spent his entire playing career with Ruch Chorzów. He currently serves as the manager of  From July 2012 to October 2013, he was the coach of the Poland national team.

Playing career
Fornalik won the 1988–89 Ekstraklasa with Ruch Chorzów.

Managerial career
Following the end of his playing career, Fornalik began a managing career. He was manager in Górnik Zabrze and Odra Wodzisław. He won the bronze medal (3rd place) with Ruch Chorzów in the 2009–10 Ekstraklasa season. In the 2011–12 season he led Ruch Chorzow to second place, the highest placement since winning the title in 1989.

In July 2012, Fornalik became the coach of the Poland national football team after the dismissal of Franciszek Smuda. On 16 October 2013, after a 0–1 loss to Ukraine in Kharkiv, which confirmed that Poland would not be going to the 2014 World Cup finals in Brazil, and a 0–2 loss to England at Wembley Stadium the previous night, PZPN sacked Fornalik due to not fulfilling his contract objectives.

On 19 September 2017, he became the manager of Piast Gliwice. Under Fornalik's rule, Piast turned into overachievers, consistently competing for spots in the upper half of the table, which resulted in winning the championship at the end of the 2018–19 season, finishing third two years later and two short-lived European campaigns. On 25 October 2022, following a poor start to the 2022–23 campaign, Fornalik left Piast and was replaced by Aleksandar Vuković two days later.

On 29 November 2022, Fornalik was announced as the new head coach of Zagłębie Lubin, agreeing to a contract until the end of the 2023–24 season.

Managerial statistics

Honours

Manager 

Piast Gliwice
Ekstraklasa: 2018–19

References

1963 births
Living people
People from Myślenice
Sportspeople from Lesser Poland Voivodeship
Association football defenders
Polish footballers
Ruch Chorzów players
Polish football managers
Polonia Bytom managers
Górnik Zabrze managers
Odra Wodzisław Śląski managers
Polonia Warsaw managers
Widzew Łódź managers
Ruch Chorzów managers
Piast Gliwice managers
Poland national football team managers
Zagłębie Lubin managers
Ekstraklasa managers
I liga managers